Fåvangfjellet Church is a parish church of the Church of Norway in Ringebu Municipality in Innlandet county, Norway. It is located in the village of Gulhaugsætra. It is an annex chapel for the Venabygd parish which is part of the Sør-Gudbrandsdal prosti (deanery) in the Diocese of Hamar. The brown, wooden church was built in a fan-shaped design in 1974 using plans drawn up by the architects Johan Amrud and Håkon Nybakken. The chapel was consecrated on 20 July 1974.

See also
List of churches in Hamar

References

Ringebu
Churches in Sør-Gudbrandsdal Deanery
Churches in Innlandet
Fan-shaped churches in Norway
Wooden churches in Norway
20th-century Church of Norway church buildings
Churches completed in 1974
1974 establishments in Norway